The 1905 Iowa Hawkeyes football team represented the University of Iowa in the 1905 Western Conference football season. This was John Chalmers' third and final season as head coach of the Hawkeyes.

Schedule

References

Iowa
Iowa Hawkeyes football seasons
Iowa Hawkeyes football